Archibald Brash (born 18 January 1873) was a Scottish footballer.

Brash was a diminutive right winger who signed for Sheffield Wednesday in July 1894 from St Mirren. He was a member of the 1896 F.A. Cup winning team. He joined Crewe Alexandra in 1898 before returning to Wednesday for a second spell. He was sold to Leicester Fosse in June 1900 for £110, but did not live up to his big reputation. In August 1901 Brash returned to Scotland to sign for Aberdeen, where he saw out his playing career.

External links
Adrian Bullock Profile
Foxestalk Profile

1873 births
Year of death missing
Scottish footballers
St Mirren F.C. players
Sheffield Wednesday F.C. players
English Football League players
Scottish Football League players
Crewe Alexandra F.C. players
Leicester City F.C. players
Aberdeen F.C. (1881) players
Association football outside forwards
FA Cup Final players
Footballers from West Lothian